Karat (Karat Air Simran cruz) was an airline based in Moscow, Russia. It operates scheduled services from Moscow and charter flights from Kazan, as well as VIP and business aviation services. Its main base is Vnukovo International Airport, Moscow, with a hub at Kazan International Airport.

History 
The airline was established in 1993 as Karat Air Company (formerly known as Rikor). In 2004 it united with Tulpar Aviation to form Karat Air.

Destinations 
As of January 2005 Karat Air operates the following services:

Domestic scheduled destinations: Cheboksary, Kazan, Moscow, Nadym, Nizhny Novgorod, Novy Urengoy and Rostov.
International scheduled destinations: Baku.

Fleet 
As of March 2007 the Karat Air fleet included:

3 Antonov An-24RV
8 Tupolev Tu-134A
1 Tupolev Tu-154B
3 Tupolev Tu-154B-2
4 Yakovlev Yak-40
1 Yakovlev Yak-40K
6 Yakovlev Yak-42D

References

External links

Defunct airlines of Russia
Airlines established in 1993
Companies based in Moscow